The Chilean Handball Federation (CHF) is the governing body of handball and beach handball in the Republic of Chile. Founded in 1980, CHF is affiliated to the International Handball Federation and the Pan-American Team Handball Federation. CHF is also affiliated to the Chilean Olympic Committee. It is based in Santiago.

National teams
 Chile men's national handball team
 Chile women's national handball team
 Chile men's national junior handball team
 Chile women's national junior handball team
 Chile men's national youth handball team
 Chile women's national youth handball team

Competitions hosted

International
Not yet

Continental
 2001 Pan American Men's Youth Handball Championship
 2002 Pan American Men's Junior Handball Championship
 2004 Pan American Men's Handball Championship
 2007 Pan American Men's Junior Handball Championship
 2009 Pan American Women's Handball Championship
 2010 Pan American Men's Handball Championship
 2012 Pan American Women's Youth Handball Championship
 2016 Pan American Women's Youth Handball Championship
 2016 Pan American Women's Club Handball Championship
 2017 Pan American Men's Youth Handball Championship

Affiliated Clubs
 Club Italiano Balonmano de Villa Alemana
 BM Usab
 Club Deportivo Luterano de Valparaíso
 BM Inter
 Balónmano Ovalle
 Unión Machali

References

External links
 Official website (in Spanish)
 Chilean Handball Federation at the IHF website.

Handball governing bodies
Handball in Chile
Pan-American Team Handball Federation
Sport in Chile
Handball
Handball
1980 establishments in Chile
Sports organizations established in 1980